Musik ombord is a 1958 Swedish film directed by Sven Lindberg and starring Alice Babs. The film's sets were designed by the art director Nils Nilsson.

Cast 

Alice Babs
Sven Lindberg
Lena Nyman
Mikael Bolin
Svend Asmussen
Ulrik Neumann
Lena Granhagen
Tage Severin
Douglas Håge
Paul Kuhn
Ove Tjernberg
Rolf Johansson
Monica Ekberg
Erik Strandell
Eivor Landström
Torsten Winge
Birgitta Tegelberg
Siv Ericks
John Norrman
Synnøve Strigen
Kotti Chave
Ragnar Sörman
Sten Ardenstam
Göthe Grefbo
Curt Löwgren
Birger Sahlberg
Bibi Carlo
Lars Kühler
Jan Tiselius
Hilding Bladh

References

External links 

1958 films
1950s Swedish-language films
1958 musical films
Swedish musical films
1950s Swedish films